The 1996 World Cup of Golf took place 21–24 November at the Erinvale Golf Club in Somerset West, Cape Town, South Africa. It was the 42nd World Cup. The tournament was a 72-hole stroke play team event (32 teams) with each team consisting of two players from a country. The combined score of each team determined the team results. Individuals also competed for the International Trophy. The prize money totaled $1,500,000 with $400,000 going to the winning pair and $100,000 to the top individual. The South African team of Ernie Els and Wayne Westner won by 18 strokes over the United States team of Steve Jones	 and Tom Lehman. Els took the International Trophy by three strokes over Westner. It was only the fourth time in the history of the World Cup, two players from the same squad finished first and second individually.

22 nations qualified automatically with the remaining 10 nations gaining entry through a qualifying tournament in Jamaica.

Teams

Source

Scores
Team

Source

International Trophy

Sources

References

World Cup (men's golf)
Golf tournaments in South Africa
Sports competitions in Cape Town
World Cup golf
World Cup golf
World Cup golf
1990s in Cape Town